Dmytriy Vasylyovych Pavlish (born 30 September 1999) is a Ukrainian professional footballer who plays as a centre-back for Mariupol.

Career
Born in Zakarpattia Oblast, Pavlish began his career in the local youth sportive schools, until his transfer to the FC Shakhtar youth sportive school in 2013.

He played in the Ukrainian Premier League Reserves and never made his debut for the senior Shakhtar Donetsk's squad. In August 2020 he signed one-year loan contract with the Ukrainian Premier League's debutant FC Mynai and made the debut for this team as a second half-time substituted player in a winning home match against FC Oleksandriya on 13 September 2020.

References

External links
 
 

1999 births
Living people
People from Mukachevo
Ukrainian footballers
Association football defenders
FC Shakhtar Donetsk players
FC Mynai players
FC Hirnyk-Sport Horishni Plavni players
FC Yarud Mariupol players
Ukrainian Premier League players
Ukrainian First League players
Sportspeople from Zakarpattia Oblast